United 300 is an American short film that parodies United 93 (2006) and 300 (2007). It won the MTV Movie Spoof Award at the MTV Movie Awards 2007. The short was created by Andy Signore along with some of his friends. During his speech, he said, roughly, "The film was not making fun of a tragedy; it was a tribute to those who stood up against tyranny".

Synopsis

The film is about the 300 Spartans defending the passengers against German terrorists.  The Spartans defend the entryway to the cockpit of the plane in a parallel to how the Spartans in 300 defended the narrow pass of Thermopylae.

In between fighting, the terrorists' emperor Jerxes (wearing the same costume as Xerxes in 300)  holds audience with Leonidas while sitting on his "throne" (the plane lavatory's toilet). Jerxes criticizes Gerard Butler's performance as Leonidas in 300, by asking the Spartan King why he has to shout all of his dialogue, and pointing out that if he shouts less, the times when he does shout will have more dramatic impact.  Leonidas responds to this by declaring "I'm not yelling, I'm just passionate!"  Leonidas also threatens to take the plane down, to which Jerxes warns "We'll be forced to land in Ohio!"  Leonidas responds, "Then tonight, we dine in Cleveland!"  At one point, turbulence causes the plane's captain to turn on the "wear seatbelts" sign, which both sides observe and leads to a pause in the fighting, glaring awkwardly at each other from their seats. Once the turbulence passes the fight erupts again. At the end, Jerxes proclaims "This is madness!" and is kicked out of the plane's airlock. Leonidas responds, "This is United!"

Cast

Scott Burn as King Leonidas
Ken Gamble as Jerxes, terrorist emperor
Ceilidh Lamont as the Stewardess
Larry Butler as the Pilot
Jorg Sirtl as Hans, terrorist commander
Victor Fischbarg as Lars, terrorist
Bill Eegle as unnamed bald terrorist
Mikel Porter as unnamed terrorist who gets speared first

Spartans

Chris Bradley
Ryan Caldwell
Shaun Gomez as Ajax
Art Green
Bob MacColl
Travis McElory
Brad Morriston
Guy M. Nardulli
Micah Nauman
Rama
Geoff Stirling
John Theodore as bandaged Spartan
Jeff Victor
Sigmound Watkins

Passengers

Dave Bell
Alphounse Boulanger as older passenger
Ahren Boulanger
Sharon Cottrell
Daniel Hartley
Miranda Signore

References

External links
 

2007 films
Films set on airplanes
2000s parody films
American aviation films
2007 black comedy films
2007 short films
Cultural depictions of Leonidas I
2007 comedy films
American black comedy films
2000s English-language films
2000s American films